BBC Look East is a BBC regional television news programmes for the East of England made by BBC East.

History

The first BBC television news bulletins for the East of England began on 5 October 1959. These bulletins were only three minutes in length.

The bulletin was extended to ten minutes in 1962 and named East Anglia at Six Ten, and then relaunched as the twenty minute programme Look East on 28 September 1964.

Look East is broadcast from BBC East's headquarters at The Forum, Norwich. Prior to 29 September 2003, the programme aired from studios in St Catherine's Close, Norwich.

The programme can be watched in any part of the UK (and Europe) on Sky Digital channel 961, and channel 962 for the "west" sub-regional service from Cambridge or Freesat channels 953 (East) and 954 (West), on the BBC UK regional TV on satellite service. The services were added to the Sky Digital platform on 29 July 2003 and were available on Freesat from launch.

In 1997, BBC Look East launched the sub-regional service, Close Up, for viewers covered by the Sandy Heath transmitting station and its relays. The opt-out allowed the two sub-regions to provide, during the main evening programme, around 10 minutes of news relevant to their area.

From 2018 to 2022, there were two separate editions BBC Look East for the main programme and the late news bulletin on weeknights.
BBC Look East - East which covers Norfolk, Suffolk and Essex
BBC Look East - West which covers Bedfordshire, Milton Keynes (Buckinghamshire), Northamptonshire, parts of Hertfordshire, Cambridgeshire and Peterborough.

At the end of the 18:30 programme on 30 September 2021, Stewart White announced his retirement from the BBC after 37 years as a main presenter of Look East.

On 26 May 2022 it was announced that following BBC cost-cutting measures the separate West edition of the programme would end, which it did in December 2022. The Cambridge studios has closed, with all broadcasts from that point returning to their pre-1997 region-wide format broadcast from the existing studios in Norwich. The Oxford edition of South Today was also scrapped.

Broadcast times
On weekdays, BBC look East broadcasts six three-minute opt-outs during BBC Breakfast at 27 and 57 minutes past each hour. A fifteen-minute lunchtime programme follows at 13:30 before the main 27-minute edition at 18:30. A seven-minute late update is shown at 22:30, following the BBC News at Ten.

BBC Look East also airs three bulletins during the weekend: two early evening bulletins on Saturday and Sunday and a late night bulletin on Sundays, following the BBC News at Ten. The times of these bulletins usually vary.

Historical 
From 2008 until 2018, the BBC One 8pm News Summary was a bulletin derived from the BBC Three 60 Seconds format, delivered across all BBC regions including BBC Look East with a separate set of paired presenters.

It was significant for younger audiences according to the BBC: "..For 1.7 million viewers the 8pm summary was the only BBC TV News they saw in that week with nearly 600,000 in the 16-34 year old bracket.."

The regular 8pm Presenters included Janine Machin Claudia Liza-Armah, Waseem Mirza and Mike Cartwright, with the last 8pm broadcast from Cambridge and all BBC Regions on Wednesday 30 May 2018.

See also 

 BBC News
 ITV News Anglia

References

External links

1964 British television series debuts
1960s British television series
1970s British television series
1980s British television series
1990s British television series
2000s British television series
2010s British television series
2020s British television series
BBC Regional News shows
East of England
English-language television shows
Television news in England